Interstate 526 (I-526) is a  auxiliary route of I-26, providing a partial beltway around Charleston, South Carolina, in the United States. The route serves several purposes, firstly, as a bypass for through traffic on U.S. Route 17 (US 17) to avoid downtown Charleston, and, secondly, for traffic on I-26 bound for the coastal towns located north and south of Charleston. The route is not yet complete, as the western terminus it is planned for the route to be extended an additional . After the eastern terminus, the roadway continues as a short business route, known as Interstate 526 Business (I-526 Bus.).

Route description
I-526 begins at an incomplete interchange with US 17 (Savannah Highway) and South Carolina Highway 7 (SC 7, Sam Rittenberg Boulevard) in the West Ashley section of the city of Charleston, just north of the Stono River. The interchange includes a loop ramp from northbound US 17, a ramp from southbound US 17, and a half-diamond interchange with SC 7. The four-lane freeway heads north past the Citadel Mall and meets SC 461 at a partial cloverleaf interchange. SC 461 heads west as Glenn McConnell Parkway and east as Paul Cantrell Boulevard; both directions lead to SC 61 (Ashley River Road). I-526 crosses SC 61 and uses the General William C. Westmoreland Bridge to cross the Ashley River into the city of North Charleston. The freeway has diamond interchanges with Leeds Avenue and SC 642 (Dorchester Road) and crosses over CSX's Charleston Subdivision.

I-526 continues through a connected pair of half-diamond interchanges with Montague Avenue and International Boulevard. Both streets lead to the North Charleston Coliseum and Charles Towne Square; the latter one is the access road for Charleston International Airport. The Interstate curves east and reaches its junction with I-26, which is a cloverleaf interchange except for a flyover ramp from eastbound I-526 to westbound I-26. I-526 crosses over Norfolk Southern Railway's SC Line and has a partial cloverleaf interchange with Rivers Avenue, which carries US 52 and US 78. The Interstate continues from its overpass of the U.S. Routes as a viaduct above wetlands along Filbin Creek. The viaduct crosses over the CSX rail line again and has a four-ramp partial cloverleaf interchange with Rhett Avenue and a half-diamond interchange with Virginia Avenue. The Rhett Avenue interchange includes a U-turn ramp that allows access from westbound I-526 to Virginia Avenue and from the avenue to eastbound I-526.

I-526 crosses the Cooper River on the high-level Don N. Holt Bridge and enters the Daniel Island section of the city of Charleston in Berkeley County. The freeway has partial cloverleaf interchanges on either side of Beresford Creek with Clements Ferry Road and Seven Farms Drive/River Landing Drive. Both interchanges lead to Blackbaud Stadium, home of the Charleston Battery, and the Family Circle Tennis Center, home of the Family Circle Cup. I-526 continues southeast across the Wando River on the James B. Edwards Bridge back into Charleston County and the town of Mount Pleasant. The freeway has a partial cloverleaf interchange with Long Point Road and curves south at Hobcaw Creek. I-526 has a partial flyover interchange to and from US 17 in the direction of Georgetown before the Interstate reaches its eastern terminus at a partial cloverleaf interchange with US 17 (Johnnie Dodds Boulevard). The highway continues as I-526 Bus., a four-lane highway that follows Chuck Dawley Boulevard to SC 703 in the center of Mount Pleasant.

All of I-526 is included as part of the National Highway System, a system of roadways important to the nation's economy, defense, and mobility.

History
Planning of the freeway dates back to the 1960s; construction on the first section began in 1979. Opened in 1982 as an unnumbered freeway, it traversed from Ashley River Road (SC 61) to Leeds Avenue, crossing over the Ashley River.

In 1985, the freeway became SC 31, connecting US 17/SC 7 to Dorchester Road (SC 642). By 1987, it extended to International Boulevard, providing access to the Charleston International Airport.

In 1989, the freeway was rechristened as I-526 after it connected with I-26 (exit 212). In 1992, I-526 was extended east over the Cooper River to Daniel Island, then over the Wando River to Mount Pleasant and its current eastern terminus with US 17 and I-526 Bus.

In 1993, the Robert B. Scarborough Bridge was opened, connecting downtown Charleston with James Island; it is signed as SC 30. Since 1993, several residents and groups in the area have fought against the completion of I-526, which will connect both James Island and Johns Island. Approximately  separate the eastern terminus of I-526's current extent from the eastern terminus of SC 30. The mileage markers and exit numbers on both SC 30 and I-526 are based on an eventual merging of the routes, with miles 1 to 3 occurring on SC 30 and miles 10 to 30 used on the current I-526 route.

Future
The proposed missing section of I-526 was the subject of an environmental study that was completed in early 2014. Various alternative routings and options are being reviewed, but the general plan is to extend south from US 17 to Johns Island and then east to James Island, where it will connect with SC 30 (possibly renumbering it). Some alternatives shown include the possibility that it will be built in expressway grade instead, falling short of being labeled an Interstate Highway.

Citing Charleston County's inability to provide funds to cover the project's increased cost, the State Transportation Infrastructure Bank (SIB) board voted on May 26, 2016, to abandon the proposed extension of I-526 across James and Johns Islands.

In 2021, SCDOT revived the 526 extension project, aiming to start construction by 2024.

Exit list

Interstate 526 Business

Interstate 526 Business (I-526 Bus.) is a  four-lane boulevard-grade business spur of I-526 along Chuck Dawley Boulevard between Johnnie Dodds Boulevard (US 17) and Ben Sawyer Boulevard (SC 703). The route was originally part of U.S. Route 17 Business (US 17 Bus.)/US 701 Bus.; signed east–west, it has not changed since inception.

I-526 Bus. is not part of the National Highway System.

See also

References

External links

Mapmikey's South Carolina Highways Page: I-526

26-5
26-5
526
526
Interstate 26-5
Interstate 26-5
Transportation in Charleston County, South Carolina
Transportation in Berkeley County, South Carolina